"Love's Found You and Me" is a song recorded by American country music artist Ed Bruce.  It was released in April 1982 as the fourth single from the album One to One.  The song reached number 13 on the US Billboard Hot Country Singles & Tracks chart.  Bruce wrote the song with Ronnie Rogers.

Chart performance

References

1982 songs
1982 singles
Ed Bruce songs
Songs written by Ed Bruce
Songs written by Ronnie Rogers
Song recordings produced by Tommy West (producer)
MCA Records singles